The list of ship launches in 1995 includes a chronological list of all ships launched in 1995.


References

1995
1995 in transport